Marc Bessler, M.D. is an American surgeon known for his innovations in bariatrics. He is currently the United States Surgical Professor of Surgery at Columbia University Medical Center and also serves as a content contributor for Bariatric Surgery Source. Dr. Bessler specializes in surgical management of morbid obesity and laparoscopic surgery of the stomach, among other specialties.

Education 
Marc Bessler earned his medical degree from New York University School of Medicine. He then completed his residency in general surgery and his fellowship in surgical endoscopy at the NewYork-Presbyterian Hospital in New York City.

Career 
Dr. Bessler has performed, or helped perform, procedures on several prominent Americans. He assisted in the liver transplant of Alonzo Mourning, removing the donor kidney from one of Mourning's relatives. He also performed the gastric bypass procedure on Michael Genadry, who played Mark Vanacore on Ed, and has performed bariatric procedures on at least two contestants from The Biggest Loser.

Innovative procedures 
In 1997, Dr. Bessler was among the first surgeons to perform bariatric surgery laparoscopically in the United States. In 2008, Dr. Bessler participated in a trial for "Toga", or transoral gastroplasty, where instruments are passed through a patient's mouth and into the stomach, which is a less invasive form of surgery than laparoscopy.

Dr. Bessler was also the first surgeon to perform the NOTES (natural orifice translumenal endoscopic surgery) procedure. In this procedure, Dr. Bessler was able to make a small incision in the vaginal wall and then retrieve and pass a kidney or gallbladder through the incision. This procedure is also less invasive than laparoscopy, resulting in a faster recovery time.

References

External links 
 Dr. Marc Bessler at Columbia University Department of Surgery

American surgeons
American physicians
Living people
Medical educators
Columbia University faculty
Year of birth missing (living people)